The 2010 NRL season consisted of 26 weekly regular season rounds, starting on 12 March and ending on 5 September, followed by four weeks of play-offs culminating in the grand final on 3 October.

Regular season

Round 1

For the first time since 2006, the Penrith Panthers opened their season with a victory.

Round 2

Greg Inglis of the Melbourne Storm played his 100th club game.

Round 3

The Cronulla-Sutherland Sharks lost their 13th straight match, squalling the competition record for a losing streak since the NRL's inception in 1998.
The St George Illawarra Dragons' victory meant for the first time they won the first three matches of the season.
The Brisbane Broncos conceded the highest number of points ever in a home game.
The Roosters' 60–14 defeat was the highest number of points conceded for the team since the NRL inception in 1998.
Fuifui Moimoi of the Parramatta Eels played his 100th career club game.

Round 4

Nathan Cayless of the Parramatta Eels became the first player to record 200 games as club captain.
The crowd of 25,480 at Etihad Stadium recorded Melbourne's highest ever regular season home crowd figure.
The Sydney Roosters defeated the Brisbane Broncos at the SFS on Good Friday for the first time since 2003.
Tim Sheens of the Wests Tigers recorded his 300th victory as a coach.
The Cronulla-Sutherland Sharks ended their longest losing streak (13) this round.
The North Queensland Cowboys defeated the Gold Coast Titans at home for the first time.

Round 5

Round 6

Nathan Hindmarsh became the Parramatta Eels' most capped player, overtaking Brett Kenny by playing his 266th game.
Glenn Stewart of the Manly-Warringah Sea Eagles played his 100th club game.
Luke Priddis played his 300th career match with the St George Illawarra Dragons.
The Melbourne Storm fell to its first defeat at Etihad Stadium since 2001.
The Canberra Raiders' loss to the Roosters was their 12th successive defeat at the Sydney Football Stadium against that opposition, a record that stretches back to 1995.

Round 7

From round 7, the Melbourne Storm will not be allowed to earn any further competition points for the rest of the 2010 season due to salary cap breaches.
The Parramatta Eels won its first match at Dairy Farmers Stadium since 2000, whilst the South Sydney Rabbitohs won its first match in Canberra Stadium since 2005.

Round 8

This round Wests Tigers coach Tim Sheens became the first coach ever to reach 600 games.

Round 9

No club games were played on Friday night due to the 2010 ANZAC Test and City vs Country Origin representative matches being played on that day.
The Gold Coast Titans won their first ever game at EnergyAustralia Stadium.
The Brisbane Broncos became the first team to post a NRL victory at AAMI Park by defeating home team the Melbourne Storm. Their win was also the first in any Storm home ground (Olympic Park Stadium and Docklands Stadium) since 2003.

Round 10 - Heritage Round

The South Sydney Rabbitohs recorded their biggest win at the Sydney Cricket Ground.

Round 11

Players selected for Game One of the 2010 State of Origin series were unavailable to play NRL matches for this round.

Round 12

The Sydney Roosters ended their losing streak against Gold Coast Titans, having not beaten them since the 2007 NRL Season.

Round 13

Round 14

Players selected for Game Two of the 2010 State of Origin series were unavailable to play NRL matches for this round.

Round 15

Beau Ryan recorded the milestone of 1000 tries for the Wests Tigers.
Brett Finch of the Melbourne Storm played his 250th first grade game.

Round 16 - Women in League Round

Darren Lockyer reached 329 club games to achieve an individual record for the most club games at a single club and overtook Andrew Ettingshausen to become sixth for most club games played.
The St. George Illawarra Dragons played their 300th premiership match.
The Cronulla Sharks' golden point extra-time victory over the Cowboys equalled their greatest comeback in their club's history, coming from 18–0 down at halftime to achieve a 19–20 victory.
The South Sydney Rabbitohs defeated the Melbourne Storm for the first time since 2004.
The New Zealand Warriors won its first New Zealand match outside of Auckland since 2006.

Round 17

Players selected for Game Three of the 2010 State of Origin series were unavailable to play NRL matches for this round.
Nathan Cayless of the Parramatta Eels played his 250th club game.
The Wests Tigers defeated the Brisbane Broncos for the first time since 2006.
The Penrith Panthers recorded just its third win overall at WIN Jubilee Oval.

Round 18

Round 19 - Rivalry Round

Brett Kimmorley and Braith Anasta played their 300th and 200th games respectively.
The match between the Penrith Panthers and the Parramatta Eels recorded a CUA Stadium attendance record of 22,582.

Round 20

The Gold Coast Titans became the first Gold Coast franchise to ever win at Jubilee Oval.
The match between Wests Tigers and Manly-Warringah Sea Eagles at Bluetongue Stadium equaled the attendance record for the second time, being at full capacity.

Round 21

Anthony Minichiello of the Sydney Roosters played his 200th NRL game.
Jamie Soward of the St. George Illawarra Dragons played his 100th NRL game.

Round 22

Brad Tighe of the Penrith Panthers played his 100th game.

Round 23

Shane Flanagan won his first game as replacement coach for the Cronulla Sharks.
Nathan Merritt of the South Sydney Rabbitohs recorded 100 career tries.
The Penrith Panthers lost its first match at Campbelltown Stadium since 1996.

Round 24

Anthony Minichiello of the Sydney Roosters recorded 100 career tries.
Cooper Vuna of the Newcastle Knights recorded four tries against the Broncos to equal with Andrew Johns, Adam Macdougall and Darren Albert for the club record of most tries scored by a player in a match.
Michael Gordon of the Penrith Panthers scored 30 points (3 tries, 9 goals) against the Rabbitohs to surpass Ryan Girdler for the club record of most points in a match by a player.

Round 25

Adam MacDougall of the Newcastle Knights broke his club's all-time individual tryscoring record, surpassing Timana Tahu with 83 tries.
Canberra Raiders' captain Alan Tongue played his 200th first grade game.
Petero Civoniceva became the first (and only) player to be sent off this season and the first captain since the NRL's inception in 1998 to be sent off.

Round 26

Matthew Bowen of the North Queensland Cowboys played his 200th club game.
Matt Cooper of the St George Illawarra Dragons recorded 100 career tries.
The Canberra Raiders won its first match at Suncorp Stadium since 2004 and the first in Queensland since 2006.
The Brisbane Broncos will miss the finals series for the first time since 1991.
Parramatta Legend Nathan Cayless played his final game in the NRL due to his retirement. He holds the record for most games as captain in the NRL.

Finals series

Qualifying finals

By defeating the Warriors, the Gold Coast Titans achieved their first finals victory.
Manu Vatuvei of the New Zealand Warriors broke his club's all-time try scoring record, surpassing Stacey Jones with 78 tries.
Matt Cooper of the St George Illawarra Dragons broke his club's all-time try scoring record, surpassing Nathan Blacklock with 102 tries.
The match between the Wests Tigers and Sydney Roosters became the first finals match to be decided in golden point extra-time since its introduction in 2003, with the game taking 100 minutes before being decided. It was the Roosters first win in a finals series since 2004 and the Wests Tigers first ever finals loss.
The Canberra Raiders achieved their first finals victory since 2000, coincidentally against the Panthers, whilst the St George Illawarra Dragons achieved their first since 2006, again coincidentally against the same opposition and by the same score of 28–0.

2nd qualifying final

The 2010 NRL Second Qualifying Final was a rugby league match contested between the Wests Tigers and Sydney Roosters in the first week of the 2010 NRL finals series on 11 September 2010. The match is notable as it was the first finals match to be played under the golden point rule since it was introduced in 2003. The match was hailed as "one of the greatest matches in recent memory".

Background

Both the Sydney Roosters and Wests Tigers had qualified for the NRL finals series, held annually during September of every NRL season, after varying absences: the Roosters had finished last in 2009 after reaching the finals in 2008, whilst the Tigers had not reached the finals since winning the premiership in 2005. The Tigers recorded their best ever regular season by winning 15 of its 24 matches and finishing third on the ladder, both surpassing the previous records set in 2005, whilst the Roosters won 14 of their 24 matches to finish sixth at the end of the regular season.

The McIntyre final eight system, which was in place at the time, meant that the two teams were to be drawn against each other in the first week of the finals. The Roosters had won both of their meetings in the regular season, by 12 points in Round 2 and by four points in Round 8.

Match details

Team lists

1st half
The Tigers had three chances, through Gareth Ellis, to score the first try of the match within the first 13 minutes, however, on each occasion, he was denied: first after Todd Carney had dislodged the ball from his hands, the second after he was held up over the line by some desperate Roosters defence, and the third after Benji Marshall was penalised for an off-the-ball incident with Mitchell Pearce. They were, however, the most dominant team of the first half, scoring two tries, through Lote Tuqiri and Beau Ryan, to the Roosters' sole penalty goal (kicked by Carney), and taking a 10–2 lead into half-time.

Ellis was placed on report in the 18th minute for a high shot on Carney; he subsequently escaped any judiciary sanction over the incident.

2nd half
Blake Ayshford scored first for the Tigers eight minutes into the second half, and, following by a field goal by captain Robbie Farah soon after, the Tigers' lead had stretched to 15–2, and it appeared the match was won. However, the Roosters would score two converted tries, both set up by Todd Carney for captain Braith Anasta and Mitchell Pearce, to narrow the margin to 15–14 with less than ten minutes left to play in regular time.

Simon Dwyer later appeared to win the match for the Tigers with two minutes remaining when he hit Jared Waerea-Hargreaves hard in the 78th minute of play, thus dislodging the ball from the latter's hands. This won the Tigers a scrum feed inside the Roosters' half, however, after Benji Marshall had fed the scrum, the Roosters pounced on the loose ball, giving them one last chance to win the match in the final minute. After initially trying to go for a match winning try, the ball found the hands of Braith Anasta, who kicked the match-tying field goal with mere seconds left, to send the match into golden point extra time.

Golden point period
For the first time since golden point was introduced by the NRL in 2003, a finals match was to be decided by golden point. Whereas in a regular season match the final result would be a draw after neither team scored in ten minutes of golden point, in finals matches, the match goes on for an indefinite period until any team scored through any method (try, penalty goal, field goal).

Following a scoreless first five minutes of extra time, play continued indefinitely during which Robbie Farah, Todd Carney and Mitchell Pearce all missed attempted field goal shots until Shaun Kenny-Dowall was able to intercept a Liam Fulton pass and run sixty metres to score the match winning try in the 100th minute of the match, thus completing one of the greatest comebacks in Roosters history, winning the match 19–15.

Summary

1 No conversion on goal was required following Kenny-Dowall's try, as golden point rules stipulate that a try scored in golden point is not needed to be converted.

Legacy
In a match which pitted two of the game's entertainers (Benji Marshall and Todd Carney) up against each other, the match did not disappoint. It has been remembered as "one of the greatest Roosters victories of all time", as well as "one of the most epic matches in recent times". In particular, the final five minutes in regular time proved to be the most dramatic of the match, whereby Benji Marshall left the field injured, leaving the Tigers with only 12 men. The Tigers had failed to capitalise on a Roosters error with two minutes remaining in the match, allowing the Roosters to kick the match-levelling field goal in the final seconds of regular time, sending the match into extra time, which was remembered by many for its nail-biting finish.

Teams' subsequent schedules

The result of this match, and the format of the final eight system, meant that the Tigers would only survive in the finals series if at least one of the two higher-ranked teams (St. George Illawarra or Penrith) won their respective qualifying final ties against the Sea Eagles and the Raiders. The Panthers' loss to the Raiders left the Tigers at risk of an early elimination, however they survived after the Dragons defeated the Sea Eagles in their qualifying final. They were then drawn against the Canberra Raiders, the lowest-ranked of the qualifying final winners, in a match that was to be played at Canberra Stadium.

The Tigers narrowly defeated Canberra by 26–24, thus progressing them to the preliminary finals, where they were eventually defeated by the eventual premiers, St. George Illawarra, 13–12.

The Roosters were guaranteed to remain in the finals series, regardless of any other subsequent results. However, as the third-highest ranked of the four winning teams from the first weekend of the finals series, they had to play in the second week of the finals series; they were subsequently drawn against the Penrith Panthers, the highest-ranked loser from the qualifying finals. The Roosters won 34–12, to progress to the semi-finals, where they defeated the Gold Coast Titans by 26 points to eventually make the grand final. However, the finals series eventually took its toll on the Roosters and they were soundly beaten by the Dragons 32–8 in the premiership deciding match.=

Semi finals 

The crowd of 26,746 at Canberra Stadium recorded the Raiders' highest ever home crowd figure.
The Sydney Roosters and Penrith Panthers played each other for the first time in the finals since the 2003 NRL Grand Final.

Preliminary finals

The Gold Coast Titans played their 100th game.

Grand final

See also
2010 NRL season
2010 in rugby league

References

National Rugby League season results
Results